Leslie Weate (18 March 1885 – 24 November 1949) was an Australian rules footballer who played with South Melbourne in the Victorian Football League (VFL).

Notes

External links 

1885 births
1949 deaths
Australian rules footballers from Victoria (Australia)
Sydney Swans players